The Capital Bank of Jordan (CBoJ) commonly known as Capital Bank, is a private sector bank operating in Jordan and Iraq. Established in 1995 as Export & Finance Bank, the bank sells a range of products and services across retail and corporate banking divisions. It is described by independent experts as "a boutique bank focused on corporate clients", and has a separate division for SME lending. Capital Bank owns a majority share (62%) in the National Bank of Iraq (NBI). 

As of September 2016 the bank had JOD1,964mn (USD2.77 billion) of consolidated assets and total capital of JOD329mn (USD463mn)

In February 2022, Capital Bank acquired Societe Generale Bank Jordan.

In February 2022, Capital Bank also Launched Blink which is a Digital Neo Bank.

References

External links

Banks established in 1995
Banks of Jordan
Companies based in Amman
Jordanian companies established in 1995
Companies listed on the Amman Stock Exchange